The slender rainbowfish (Melanotaenia gracilis) is a species of rainbowfish in the subfamily Melanotaeniinae which is endemic to Australia. It occurs in the extreme north of Western Australia in the systems of the Drysdale and King Edward Rivers.

References

slender rainbowfish
Freshwater fish of Western Australia
Kimberley (Western Australia)
slender rainbowfish
Taxonomy articles created by Polbot